Echinaioi is a former municipality in Phthiotis, Greece. Since the 2011 local government reform it is part of the municipality Stylida, of which it is a municipal unit.
The municipal unit has an area of 133.052 km2. Population 3,764 (2011). The seat of the municipality was in Raches.

External links
 Municipality of Echinaioi

References

Populated places in Phthiotis